Mario Baeza (28 April 1916 – 9 May 1993) was a Chilean footballer. He played in four matches for the Chile national football team from 1937 to 1947. He was also part of Chile's squad for the 1937 South American Championship.

References

External links
 

1916 births
1993 deaths
Chilean footballers
Chile international footballers
Place of birth missing
Association football defenders
Magallanes footballers
Universidad de Chile footballers